Denizli is an electoral district of the Grand National Assembly of Turkey. It elects seven members of parliament (deputies) to represent the province of the same name for a four-year term by the D'Hondt method, a party-list proportional representation system.

Members 
Population reviews of each electoral district are conducted before each general election, which can lead to certain districts being granted a smaller or greater number of parliamentary seats. Denizli's seats have remained stable since 1999, continuously electing seven MPs.

General elections

2011

June 2015

November 2015

2018

Presidential elections

2014

Notes

References 

Electoral districts of Turkey
Politics of Denizli Province